James J. Kinsella (born 25 May 1939) is an Irish professional golfer.

Kinsella played on the European Tour in the 1970s, winning the 1972 Madrid Open. He played on the European Seniors Tour in its first three seasons, 1992–94.

Professional wins (6)

European Tour wins (1)

Other wins (5)
This list is incomplete
1960 Irish Dunlop Tournament (tie with Christy O'Connor Snr)
1967 Carroll's No. 1 Tournament
1971 Irish Dunlop Tournament
1972 Irish PGA Championship
1973 Irish PGA Championship

Results in major championships

Note: Kinsella only played in The Open Championship.

CUT = missed the half-way cut
"T" = tied

Team appearances
World Cup (representing Ireland): 1968, 1969, 1972, 1973
Double Diamond International (representing Ireland): 1971, 1972, 1973, 1974
Marlboro Nations' Cup (representing Ireland): 1972
PGA Cup (representing Great Britain and Ireland): 1977 (tie)

External links

Irish male golfers
European Tour golfers
European Senior Tour golfers
1939 births
Living people